Rex Sempiterne Cælitum was a Catholic hymn that was sung in Matins during the Paschal season until 1962.

References

Latin-language Christian hymns
Liturgy of the Hours